Reconquista Airport , also known as Daniel Jukic Airport (es), is an airport serving Reconquista, a city in the Santa Fe Province of Argentina.

The Reconquista VOR-DME (Ident: RTA) and non-directional beacon (Ident: A) are located on the field.

Airlines and destinations

See also

List of airports in Argentina
Transport in Argentina

References

External links
OpenStreetMap - Reconquista Airport

Airports in Argentina